This is a timeline of East Timorese history, comprising important legal and territorial changes and political events in East Timor and its predecessor states.  To read about the background to these events, see History of East Timor.

16th century

17th century

18th century

19th century

20th century

21st century 

 
East Timorese